Each cell in this table contains a three-digit ZIP code prefix, the state where that ZIP code prefix is located, and the name of the United States Postal Service (USPS) Sectional Center Facility (SCF) that serves that ZIP code prefix, which may be in a different state. Each SCF may serve more than one three-digit ZIP code prefix. Each SCF serves local addresses whose five-digit ZIP codes start with the same set of prefixes.

 An asterisk (*) indicates that the listed place name is the "default" place name for all addresses in the prefix, that is, that addresses for all ZIP codes beginning with that three-digit prefix will have that place name in the city portion of the address (example: 23219, 23224, and 23294 will all have "Richmond, Virginia" addresses, even if the mailing address is physically located elsewhere.).
 A dagger (†) indicates that the SCF serving this prefix is in a different state.
 A double dagger (‡) indicates that the prefix was not part of the original set of ZIP Codes when the system was introduced in 1963.

Starts with 0

Starts with 1

Starts with 2

Starts with 3

Starts with 4

Starts with 5

Starts with 6

Starts with 7

Starts with 8

Starts with 9

Notes 

 Originally, the surrounding offices in Puerto Rico overlapped alphabetically. 006 was assigned for A-L, and 007 was assigned for M-Z.
 In the original lineup, Brockton city-proper was in its own prefix, 024. On July 1, 1998, Brockton switched over to 023, which covers the communities east of Brockton. On that same day, the west branches of Boston that were all originally under the 021 prefix, such as Lexington, Brookline, and Newton, were moved to the 024 prefix after a new SCF opened in Waltham, Massachusetts.
 The 201 prefix was introduced on July 1, 1996, after a new SCF opened at Dulles International Airport.
 In the original lineup, both the 207 and 208 prefixes were for anything surrounding Silver Spring, Maryland, split alphabetically with 207 from A-K and 208 from L-Z. The branches of Washington, D.C. that extended into Maryland were moved to 207, and the codes were re-distributed, with all of Montgomery County serving 208 and Prince George's County serving 207.
 All of the ZIP Codes under the 219 prefix are located in Cecil County, Maryland.
 Certain prefixes in West Virginia have two main offices. In these instances, one main office is given the first code, followed by the usual alphabetical order, then resetting to the second main office, followed by its surrounding offices alphabetically.
 The 269 prefix was active until 1965, and served seven communities directly west of Winchester, Virginia. These codes are now part of the 268 prefix, which also includes certain offices originally part of 267.
 Two cities in Pinellas County, Florida have changed their ZIP codes twice: Clearwater and Largo. It was originally under the 335 prefix, which itself originally served a wider vicinity for anything surrounding Tampa. The northern portion of that area was eventually split off to form a new prefix, 346. On July 1, 1998, Clearwater changed its codes from the 346 prefix back to the 337 prefix, which currently covers the entirety of the county. Originally, that prefix covered only St. Petersburg.
 In the original lineup, some post offices in Kentucky had ZIP Codes that were not located with in the boundaries of their respective prefixes. The only existing example of this is Closplint, whose ZIP code is 40927, even though it is located in Harlan County, which is under the 408 prefix.
 The SCF for the Davenport, Iowa area (527 and 528) is located in Rock Island, Illinois.
 Five independent branches of Chicago were originally under the 606 prefix: Riverdale, Elmwood Park, Niles, Cicero, and Alsip.
 Before getting its own prefix with just one code, Yellowstone National Park was under the 830 range, with ZIP Code 83020.
 On July 1, 2009, the rural communities outside of Mesa, Arizona in the 852 prefix were switched to a new prefix, 851, due to the rapid growth of the Phoenix metropolitan area. The 852 prefix now primarily only serves the major eastern cities in the metro: Chandler, Gilbert, Scottsdale, and Tempe.
 The 925 prefix originally covered only Riverside, California. The surrounding offices were originally under the 923 prefix.
 The present-day 926 prefix range only covers the southern and coastal portion of Orange County. This includes, Irvine, which originally had only ZIP Code, 92650. With the rapid growth of the city, however, it needed new codes, and it was eventually moved to the 927 range with Santa Ana. On July 1, 1996, the northern portion of Orange County redistributed many of its ZIP Codes to the 927 and 928 prefixes. With this change, Irvine was moved back to 926.
 Originally, the 957 prefix only served offices distantly east of Sacramento. However, with the rapid growth of suburbs in the Sacramento metropolitan area, some cities under 956 were assigned new ZIP Codes starting with 957. The offices surrounding Lake Tahoe were also changed to the 961 prefix.
 The 969 prefix serves Pacific Islands that are also U.S. territories, with the exception of Palau, which was a U.S. territory in 1963. The office for Canton Island (96901) was discontinued in 1965. Pago Pago, American Samoa (originally 96920) and Wake Island (originally 96930) both had their ZIP Codes changed.
 The now-discontinued 987 prefix was military-only and served U.S. military bases situated in Japan and Alaska. The SCF for the prefix was located in Seattle.
 All three ZIP codes under the 994 range are located in Asotin County, Washington.

See also 
 List of area codes
 List of U.S. state abbreviations

References 

United States communications-related lists
Prefixes
Lists of postal codes